The 2020–21 Boston University Terriers women's basketball team represented Boston University during the 2020–21 NCAA Division I women's basketball season. The Terriers were led by third-year head coach Marisa Moseley and played their home games at Case Gym as members of the Patriot League.

Previous season
They finished the previous season 18–12, 12–6 in Patriot League play to finish in second place. They beat  in the Quarterfinals of the Patriot League Tournament.  The tournament was cancelled after the Quarterfinals due to the COVID-19 pandemic. The NCAA tournament and NIT were also cancelled due to the pandemic.

Roster

Schedule

|-
!colspan=9 style=| Non-conference regular season
|-
!colspan=9 style=| Patriot League regular season

|-
!colspan=12 style=| Patriot League Tournament
|-

See also
2020–21 Boston University Terriers men's basketball team

References

Boston University
Boston University Terriers women's basketball seasons
Boston University Terriers women's basketball team
Boston University Terriers women's basketball team
Boston University Terriers women's basketball team
Boston University Terriers women's basketball team